Luigi Nobile (February 24, 1921 – February 18, 2009) was an Italian professional football player. He was born in Rome.

He played 2 seasons (4 games) in the Serie A for A.S. Roma, winning the championship in the 1941/42 season.

References

External links
Profile at Enciclopediadelcalcio.it

1921 births
2009 deaths
Italian footballers
Serie A players
A.S. Roma players
Association football defenders